222 was a year of the Julian calendar, in the third century AD.

222 also commonly refers to:
 222 (number), the natural number following 221 and preceding 223

222 may also refer to:

Entertainment
 2:22 (2016 film), an American-Australian thriller
 222 (Live & Uncut), a version of Patton Oswalt's comedy album Feelin' Kinda Patton
 222 (EP), María Becerra, 2019
 "222" (song), from the 2007 Paul McCartney album Memory Almost Full
 Room 222, a TV show
 The 222s, a Montreal band
 "222", a song by Flatbush Zombies on the 2013 EP BetterOffDead

Transportation and vehicles
 British Rail Class 222, a class of trains used in Great Britain
 A222 road, a road between Bexley and Croydon, UK
 222 (MBTA bus), a bus route in Boston, Massachusetts, USA
Bell 222, a helicopter
Sd.Kfz. 222, a World War II German reconnaissance vehicle
2-2-2, a classification of steam locomotive
U.S. Route 222, a road in the U.S. states of Maryland and Pennsylvania
 A bus route in London from Hounslow to Uxbridge

Weapons
 130 mm coastal defense gun A-222
A-222 Bereg, a Russian self-propelled 130 mm coastal defence gun
.222 Remington and .222 Remington Magnum, firearm cartridges

Other
 222, a formulation of the compound analgesic co-codaprin